Surafel Dagnachew Mengistu (Amharic: ሱራፌል ዳኛቸው; born 11 September 1997) is an Ethiopian professional footballer who plays as a midfielder for Ethiopian Premier League club Fasil Kenema and the Ethiopia national team.

Club career 
In 2018, Surafel joined Fasil Kenema from Adama City. Surafel was award the Ethiopian Football federation Player of the Year award for the 2018-19 season.

International goals 
Scores and results list Ethiopia's goal tally first.

References

External links
 

Ethiopian footballers
1997 births
Living people
Association football midfielders
Fasil Kenema S.C. players
2021 Africa Cup of Nations players